In the history of the European colonization of the Americas, an Indian massacre is any incident between European settlers and indigenous peoples wherein one group killed a significant number of the other group outside the confines of mutual combat in war.

Overview 
"Indian massacre" is a phrase whose use and definition has evolved and expanded over time.  The phrase was initially used by European colonists to describe attacks by indigenous Americans which resulted in mass colonial casualties.  While similar attacks by colonists on Indian villages were called "raids" or "battles", successful Indian attacks on white settlements or military posts were routinely termed "massacres".  Knowing very little about the native inhabitants of the American frontier, the colonists were deeply fearful, and often, European Americans who had rarely – or never – seen a Native American read Indian atrocity stories in popular literature and newspapers. Emphasis was placed on the depredations of "murderous savages" in their information about Indians, and as the migrants headed further west, they frequently feared the Indians they would encounter.

The phrase eventually became commonly used to also describe mass killings of American Indians.  Killings described as "massacres" often had an element of indiscriminate targeting, barbarism, or genocidal intent.

According to historian Jeffrey Ostler, "Any discussion of genocide must, of course, eventually consider the so-called Indian Wars, the term commonly used for U.S. Army campaigns to subjugate Indian nations of the American West beginning in the 1860s. In an older historiography, key events in this history were narrated as battles. It is now more common for scholars to refer to these events as massacres. This is especially so of a Colorado territorial militia’s slaughter of Cheyennes at Sand Creek (1864) and the army’s slaughter of Shoshones at Bear River (1863), Blackfeet on the Marias River (1870), and Lakotas at Wounded Knee (1890). Some scholars have begun referring to these events as “genocidal massacres,” defined as the annihilation of a portion of a larger group, sometimes to provide a lesson to the larger group."

It is difficult to determine the total number of people who died as a result of "Indian massacres". In The Wild Frontier: Atrocities during the American-Indian War from Jamestown Colony to Wounded Knee, lawyer William M. Osborn compiled a list of alleged and actual atrocities in what would eventually become the continental United States, from first contact in 1511 until 1890. His parameters for inclusion included the intentional and indiscriminate murder, torture, or mutilation of civilians, the wounded, and prisoners. His list included 7,193 people who died from atrocities perpetrated by those of European descent, and 9,156 people who died from atrocities perpetrated by Native Americans.

In An American Genocide, The United States and the California Catastrophe, 1846–1873, historian Benjamin Madley recorded the numbers of killings of California Indians between 1846 and 1873. He found evidence that during this period, at least 9,400 to 16,000 California Indians were killed by non-Indians. Most of these killings occurred in what he said were more than 370 massacres (defined by him as the "intentional killing of five or more disarmed combatants or largely unarmed noncombatants, including women, children, and prisoners, whether in the context of a battle or otherwise").

List of massacres 

This is a listing of some of the events reported then or referred to now as "Indian massacre".

Pre-Columbian era

1500–1830

1830–1915

See also 
 American Indian Wars
 List of conflicts in Canada
 List of conflicts in the United States 
 List of events named massacres
 List of massacres in Canada
 List of massacres in the United States
 Population history of indigenous peoples of the Americas

References

Bibliography 

 Anderson, Gary C., The Conquest of Texas: Ethnic cleansing in the Promised Land, 1820–1875, University of Oklahoma Press, 2005, 544 pages, 
 Baumgardner, Frank, Killing for Land in Early California – Indian Blood at Round Valley,  Algora Publishing, 2006, 312 pages, 
 Braatz, Timothy, Surviving conquest: a history of the Yavapai peoples, University of Nebraska Press, 2003, 336 pages, 
 Churchill, Ward, A Little Matter of Genocide: Holocaust and Denial in the Americas, 1492 to the Present, City Lights, 1997, 381 pages, 
 Heizer, Robert F., The Destruction of California Indians, University of Nebraska Press, Lincoln and London, 1993, 321 pages, 
 Gallay, Alan, The Indian Slave Trade: The rise of the English Empire in the American South, Yale University Press, 2003, 464 pages, 
  Gonzalez, Mario and Cook-Lynn, Elizabeth, The Politics of Hallowed Ground: Wounded Knee and the Struggle for Indian Sovereignty, University of Illinois Press, 1998,  448 pages, 
  Hamalainen, Pekka, The Comanche Empire, Yale University Press, 2008, 512 pages, 
 Himmel, Kelly F., The Conquest of the Karankawas and the Tonkawas, 1821–1859, TAMU Press, 1999, 216 pages, 
 Kiernan, Ben, "Blood and Soil: a World History of Genocide and Massacre from Sparta to Darfur", Yale University Press, 2007, 768 pages, 
 Konstantin, Phil, This Day in North American Indian History: Events in the History of North America's Native Peoples, Da Capo Press, 2002, 480 pages, 
 Madley, Benjamin, Tactics of Nineteenth Century Colonial Massacre: Tasmania, California and Beyond in Philips G. Dwyer and Lyndall Ryan, eds., Theatres of Violence: Massacres, Mass Killing and Atrocity Throughout History, Berghan Books, 2012, 350 pages, 
 Madley, Benjamin, The Genocide of California's Yana Indians in Samuel Totten and Williams S. Parsons, eds., Centuries of Genocide: Essays and Eyewitness Accounts, Routledge, 2012, pp. 16–53, 611 pages,  
 Madley, Benjamin, An American Genocide, The United States and the California Catastrophe, 1846–1873, Yale University Press, 2016, 692 pages, 
 Michno, Gregory F., Encyclopedia of Indian Wars: Western Battles and Skirmishes 1850–1890, Mountain Press Publishing Co., 2003, 448 pages, 
  Norton, Jack, "Genocide in Northwestern California : when our worlds cried", Indian Historian Press, San Francisco, 1979, 
 Reynolds, W.R., The Cherokee Struggle to Maintain Identity in the 17th and 18th Centuries, McFarland, 2015, 436 pages, 
  Scheper-Hughes, Nancy, Violence in War and Peace: An Anthology, Wiley-Blackwell, 2003, 512 pages,   
 Schwartz, E. A, The Rogue River Indian War and its aftermath, 1850–1980, University of Oklahoma Press, 1997, 
  Sipe, C. Hale, The Indian wars of Pennsylvania: An account of the Indian events, in Pennsylvania, of the French and Indian War, Pontiac's War, Lord Dunmore's War, the Revolutionary War and the Indian Uprising from 1789 to 1795. Tragedies of the Pennsylvania frontier, Telegraph Press, 1929. 793 pages.  
  Thornton, Russell, "American Indian Holocaust and Survival: a Population History since 1492", University of Oklahoma Press, 1990, 312 pages,  
 Thrapp, Dan, "The Conquest of Apacheria", University of Oklahoma Press, 1975, 422 pages,  

 
Genocidal massacres
Military history of the United States
Military history of Canada
Native American genocide
Native American history
First Nations history
Massacres of ethnic groups
Massacres in the United States
Massacres in Canada
Native American-related lists
Genocides in North America